"Me and My Broken Heart" is a song recorded by Rex Allen Jr., which he released in 1979 as a single and on his album of the same name. It was written by Rex Allen Jr.'s brother, Curtis Allen. It spent 11 weeks on Billboards Hot Country Singles chart, reaching No. 9, while reaching No. 7 on Record Worlds Country Singles chart, and No. 13 on the Cash Box Top 100 Country chart.

Chart performance

References

1979 songs
1979 singles
Warner Records singles
Rex Allen Jr. songs